Osteochilus chini is a species of cyprinid fish in the Labeoninae endemic to Sabah.

Osteochilus chini, which means bony lip, feed on algae and are common in slow water habitats.

Etymology
Named in honor of Datuk (honorific title) Chin Phui Kong (1923-ca. 2016), Malaysian ichthyologist, who helped collect type in 1956.

References

Taxa named by Jaranthada Karnasuta
Fish described in 1993
Osteochilus